Allopeas micra is a species of small, tropical, air-breathing land snail, a terrestrial pulmonate gastropod mollusk in the family Achatinidae.

Distribution 
The distribution of Allopeas micra includes:

 West Indies
 from Mexico to Bolivia
 Dominica - introduced. First reported in 2009.

References

Subulininae
Gastropods described in 1835